Viganò is a comune (municipality) in the Province of Lecco in the Italian region Lombardy, located about  northeast of Milan and about  southwest of Lecco.

Viganò borders the following municipalities: Barzanò, Missaglia, Monticello Brianza, Sirtori.

Demographic evolution

Gallery

References

External links
 

Cities and towns in Lombardy